The South Maui Coastal Heritage Corridor is a recreation and tourism project of the Tri-Isle Resource Conservation and Development Council.  The non-profit council partners with the Natural Resources Conservation Service of the United States Department of Agriculture.  The project is managed by a committee chairperson in cooperation with the Hawaii Department of Land and Natural Resources, Division of Forestry and Wildlife, Na Ala Hele Trails and Access Program, U.S. Fish and Wildlife Service, University of Hawaii, Sea Grant Extension Service, and individuals from the community of Kihei.  The project protects and provides public access to South Maui's 15 mile leeward coastline.

The project has installed interpretive signs between Maalaea and La Perouse Bay.  Each sign describes the historic importance of the area in terms of Hawaiian cultural values and traditions.  A network of bike paths is also planned.

Coastal geography of South Maui
Lahaina Pali Trail (Hoapili trail)
Papawai Point (Lookout)
McGregor Point (lighthouse)
Kapoli Beach Park
Māʻalaea Bay
Māʻalaea Small Boat Harbor
Haycraft Park
Māʻalaea Community Garden
Maui Coastal Wetlands Boardwalk
Māʻalaea
Kealia Pond National Wildlife Refuge
Kealia Pond
Māʻalaea Beach
Sugar Beach
Kihei Wharf
Mai Poina Oe lau Beach Park
Vancouver monument
Hawaiian Islands Humpback Whale Sanctuary
Kalepolepo Park
Koieie Fishpond
 David Malo's Kilolani Church
Waipuilani Park
State Beach Reserve (South Maui)
Koa i Kamaole Fishing Shrine (Kihei Public Library)
Kalama Park
Cove Park
Charley Young Beach
Kamaʻole Beach Park I
Kamaʻole Beach Park II
Kamaʻole Point
Kamaʻole Beach Park III
Kihei Boat Ramp
Keawakapu Beach
Mokapu Beach
Ulua Beach
Wailea Coastwalk
Wailea Beach
Wailea Point (Native coastal plants garden)
Polo Beach
Palauea Beach
Poolenalena Beach Park (Paipu/Chang's Beach)
Makena Landing
Keawalai Church
Maluaka Beach Park
Oneʻuli Beach (also known as Naupaka Beach)
Puu Olai (Red Hill)
Puu Olai Beach (Little Beach)
Oneloa Beach (Big Beach)
Makena State Park
Molokini Shoal Marine Life Conservation District
Ahihi Bay
 Cape Kinau
 Ahihi-Kinau Natural Area Reserve
Keone o io (Hawaii Historic Register District)
Keone oio Bay (La Perouse Bay)
Hoapili Trail (King's Highway)

See also
Cultural heritage
List of beaches in Maui

References

External links
Hoaloha Aina, Friends of the Land
Tri-Isle Resource Conservation & Development Council of Hawaii
Natural Resources Conservation Service (Umbrella site temporarily down)

Culture of Maui
Archaeological sites in Hawaii
Geography of Maui
Beaches of Maui